The Main Page is the home page of the English Wikipedia.Main Page or main page may also refer to:
 Home page, the main web page of a website
 Personal web page, a web page created by an individual with content of a personal nature

See also 
 Front page (disambiguation)
 Home page (disambiguation)
 New Page (disambiguation)
 William Main Page